Mohammed Balarabe Haladu (194428 June 1998) was a Nigerian Army Lieutenant general who served as the Commandant of the Nigerian Defence Academy from 1993 to 1994. He was also a former federal Minister for Industry.

Born in Kano, Haladu had his military training in Nigeria Military School, Zaria, Pakistan Military Academy and University College of Wales.

References

1944 births
1998 deaths
Nigerian Army officers
Nigerian Defence Academy Commandants
Nigerian generals
Nigerian Defence Academy alumni